The Comité d'études sur les formations d'ingénieurs (CEFI, in English engineer training studies committee) is the French institution which studies the questions of training and job placement for engineers in France, in partnership with associations like the CNISF (National Council of Engineers and Scientists of France). Created in 1975 by French Ministry of National Education, after that it became an association representing engineers associations, grandes écoles and companies. 

The CEFI has a website with information concerning educational system in France and job placement for graduates. 

Sometimes, it performs studies for schools or partners companies.

References

External links
 Official CEFI−Comité d'études sur les formations d'ingénieurs website

Education in France
French engineers
Engineering companies of France
Engineering universities and colleges in France
Grandes écoles
Non-profit organizations based in France
1975 establishments in France
Organizations established in 1975